The Liga Mexicana de Fútbol Amateur Association, known as the Primera Fuerza, was an amateur football league founded in Mexico in 1902 with five clubs: "Orizaba A.C.", "Pachuca A.C.", "Reforma A.C.", "Mexico Cricket Club" and "British Club". Orizaba won the league in its inaugural year. A total of 37 teams took part in this league from 1902 until 1943, when football in Mexico went professional.

History
Prior to the Liga Mayor, there was no national football league in Mexico and football competitions were held within relatively small geographical regions. The winners of the Primera Fuerza, a local league consisting of teams in and around Mexican Federal District, was considered the national champion. There were other regional leagues such as the Liga Veracruzana, Liga Occidental and Liga del Bajío that also had notable clubs. Many club owners were not keen on the idea of establishing a professional league, despite paying players under the table. With the increasing demand for football, there was a sense of urgency to unite all the local amateur leagues in Mexico to progress as a football nation. The professional national league was finally established in 1943.

The people who pushed Mexico football were Percy C. Clifford and Robert J. Blackmoore. This brought the rules of play and the first regulatory balls. English Alfred Crowle, who played for Pachuca since 1908, also had considerable influence on the sport.

In 1910 Mexico Football Club is founded, the first team formed by Alfredo B. Cuellar headed Mexican, Jorge Alberto Gomez de Parada and Sierra, then promoted by other foreign colonies: the Amicale Française in 1911, the Rovers and the Real Club Spain in 1912, the Spanish Sports Center in 1914, the Germania FV in 1915, the Catalonia in 1917, Asturias F.C. in 1918, and in 1919 Aurrerá.

Club America, founded on the union of two Marist College in 1916, was the first important team composed of Mexicans in the Mexican capital and achieved to win four consecutive championships between 1924 and 1928.

From the fusion of Sinaloa, Lusitania, Condesa, and U53 Atlante born, whose components were proletarian extraction; their leaders were the Trinidad and Refugio Martinez brothers.

While between 1918 and 1920 the teams Cuenta y Administración, Guerra y Marina y Son-Sin resulted in the team Esparta, which was then rebranded as Marte, brilliant team that never became popular, and even in the professional era and would move to Cuernavaca.

Regularly attended clubs outside the Federal District as Pachuca, Puebla AC, Veracruz Sporting Club, Iberia de Córdoba, Moctezuma de Orizaba, Orizaba AC, Tigre de Veracruz, Veracruz Spain, these being the most successful of them, Pachuca was crowned in seasons 1904–05, 1917–18 and 1919–20.

In 1919 there was a split in the Mexican League, shortly before the start of the season. Clubs Real Club España and España Veracruz solidly connected with expulsion from the club Tigres, withdrew from the League and founded on 9 February its own circuit called the Liga Nacional. As this idea went nowhere, Albinegros scheduled a series of friendly matches to remain active, with so many rivals like España de Orizaba who was defeated 9–0 on 20 October 1919, or their wins 4-0 and 2–0 against Tigres, 2–0 on the Río Blanco and the achievements of Copa Alfonso XIII in a three-game series against Reforma and the Copa Elche in two games against Asturias.

The power and influence of the Hispanic teams was such that the press of the time chose to cover their sports facilities to those meetings. Spain interference on means, suitable to be published little news about the Liga Mexicana, of which only is known that Pachuca won the trophy and the Copa Tower was suspended before completion.

The separation of the two leagues in the 1920–21 season specific; Liga Nacional included America, Real Club España, Luz y Fuerza, Amicale and Reforma. Meanwhile, the Liga Mexicana had the participation of Asturias, Internacional, México, Morelos and Germania. Immediately after the founding of the first Federación Mexicana de Futbol, the clubs fought for two years to form a single competition in August 1922 that they called Campeonato de Primera Fuerza de la FMF. That is, both tournaments were unified and the direct ancestor of the current Primera División was born. Serious this league, whose members prompted the creation of the first National team (which would dispute the first official competitions abroad of Mexican football) and also the Federación.

In 1930–31 season, the tournament was suspended after 2 days, when Asturias, Atlante, Germany, Mexico and Marte requested permission to remodel Campo Asturias (not to be confused with the Parque Asturias, built until 1936) which was in poor condition, to make their home games there; to the disagreement of Club España, Necaxa (both who owned their own parks) and the America seconded. This coupled with the conflict arose with the Real Federación Española de Fútbol, which had asked the Mexican Football Federation to disable Gaspar Rubio who had signed for Club España. It got to the point of suspension of the three clubs who unsuccessfully tried to make a parallel tournament and the Federation decided to suspend the tournament to definitively resolve administrative problems. After months of fighting, smoothed asperities and competition were refounded under the name Liga Mayor, to organize two competitions: the Preferente consisted of six teams, and the Primera Ordinaria, that served as a promotion circuit. This competition had durability and grew to cluster up to 16 teams.

Necaxa, founded by members of Compañía de Luz y Fuerza del Centro, was an unforgettable dynasty in the decade 1930-40 known as the "11 brothers"; the first team to win promotion, won four league tournaments and two Cup, becoming the first Campeonísimo of Mexico. Among the ranks of the "11 brothers" also arises a top Mexican soccer legends: Horacio Casarín.

In the 1938–39 season a foreign team was included when the Basque Country national football team arrived in Mexico. In 1937, during the Spanish Civil War, the first Basque President José Antonio Aguirre, had decided to send a Basque football team abroad in order to raise funds for the civil war that was taking place in Spain. When their homeland was captured by their enemies the players dared not return home.  The Basques, under the name Club Deportivo Euzkadi, were allowed into the league and developed a fierce rivalry with traditional all Spanish teams (Club España and Asturias) and despite winning 13 of the 17 games played, they came out of the tournament as runners-up to Asturias. At the end of the season, the team disbanded and the players became part of the Liga Mayor teams or other leagues latinoamericanas.

In 1940-41 Selección Jalisco joined Liga Mayor, formed by elements of Guadalajara, Atlas, Nacional, y Oro. This team had played a series of friendly matches between 1926 and 1930 as part of promotional tours by Liga de Occidente, however that season they integrated indefinitely as a club of Liga Mayor.

Clubs participating in the league

Notes

List of all Primera Fuerza Champions 

Notes

Titles by club

Notes

Statistics

Goalscorers

References

 
 
Mex
Sports leagues established in 1902